NH 10 may refer to:

 National Highway 10 (India)
 New Hampshire Route 10, United States
 NH10 (film), a 2015 Indian thriller film